Charles Nicolas Alexandre Haldat du Lys (24 December 1770 – 26 November 1852) was a French physicist who performed experimental work in hydrostatics.

He was a critic of the reliability of Benjamin Thompson's researches on the generation of heat, An Experimental Enquiry Concerning the Source of the Heat which is Excited by Friction.

References

Bibliography

1770 births
1852 deaths
French physicists